Roma was an Italian-built semi-rigid airship, designated by its constructor as the Model T-34. Purchased by the United States from the Italian government in 1921, Roma was operated by the United States Army Air Service from November 1921 to February 21, 1922, when it crashed in Norfolk, Virginia, killing 34 people aboard, with 9 survivors. As a result of this accident, Roma  was the last hydrogen inflated airship flown by the US military;  all subsequent airships were inflated with helium.

Design and development

Designated and advertised as the Model T-34, it was the first project of the Stabilimento Costruzioni Aeronautiche ("Aeronautical Construction Factory"), for the partnership of Nobile, Usuelli, Croce and Giuseppe Valle. The T-34 was designed for trans-Atlantic crossings carrying up to 100 passengers, though initially fitted for 25. When constructed, Roma  was the largest semi-rigid airship in the world.

As a semi-rigid design it was built about a rigid keel - though the keel was partially articulated to allow some flexibility. The passenger spaces and control cabin were within the keel. The engines, 400 hp Ansaldo 4E-2940 V-12s, were mounted outside, angled such that the slipstreams would not interfere with each other.

Service
In September 1920, Roma made its first trial flight.

The airship was purchased by the United States Army Air Service for $184,000 (equivalent to $ million in ). During the inspection and delivery ceremonies in March 1921, the Italians treated the new owners with a  flight on the Roma, from Rome to Naples and back, carrying the US Ambassador, his wife and several Army officers. The passengers were served lunch while flying over the island of Capri.

The Army originally planned  to fly the Roma to the United States, but instead the dirigible was dismantled, packed in several crates and transported by ship, arriving in the US in August, 1921. When the Army unpacked the crates after their arrival at Langley Field, they found the airship's fabric skin mildewed and weakened.  After being reassembled by US Army Air Service crews at Langley, Roma flew in America for the first time on November 15, 1921, with minor problems. On a subsequent flight, a propeller disintegrated, ripped open the envelope and slashed a gas bag; the airship managed to return safely.

During a flight to Washington, D.C. on December 21, 1921, the Roma experienced several engine breakdowns due to the cold weather. After the return flight to Langley was made on only four engines, the original Italian Ansaldo engines were replaced with six Liberty L-12's.

Crash

The Roma crashed in Norfolk, Virginia during a test flight on February 21, 1922. The airship left Langley Field shortly  before 1:00 PM in the afternoon, with 45 people on board, most of whom were US Army airmen. There were also a few civilians, including mechanics and government observers. aboard for the test flight. After lifting off, the pilot, Captain Dale Mabry, set a course along the shore of Chesapeake Bay that took it over Buckroe Beach, and Fort Monroe, before crossing Hampton Roads and passing over Willoughby Spit en-route to the Norfolk Navy Base. The crash of the Roma was caused by failure of the airship's box rudder system, which allowed it to maneuver over tight areas. Just before the bow struck the ground, the Roma contacted high-voltage power lines and burst into flames. A total of 34 people were killed, 8 were injured, and 3 escaped unharmed. Among the dead was the pilot, Mabry. The crash of the Roma  marked the greatest disaster in American aeronautics history up to that time.

Master Sergeant Harry A. Chapman earned the Cheney Award for his heroics during the crash. He was the first recipient of the award, which was presented by President Calvin Coolidge in 1928.

Although it was America's worst aviation disaster at the time, a century later the crash of the Roma has largely been forgotten, eclipsed by the  Hindenburg disaster, which occurred 15 years later and  effectively ended the airship era. At Langley Air Force base, the spot where the massive hangar that housed the Roma once stood is now a parking lot; it is still known as the "LTA" ("lighter than air") area, and the base's Roma Road is named in memory of the ill-fated airship.

Specifications

References

Bibliography

 Tampa Times, February 22, 1922. Page 1.

Airships of Italy
Airships of the United States
1920s Italian military trainer aircraft
Accidents and incidents involving balloons and airships
Aviation accidents and incidents in 1922
Aviation accidents and incidents in Virginia